Seth & Nirva are an American Christian music husband-and-wife duo from Nashville, Tennessee, and they started making music together in 2013. They have released one extended play, I Need You (2013), and one studio album, Never Alone (2016), the album with Integrity Music.

Background
They started making music together in 2013, after they met while touring and Nirva being a member of tobyMac's DiverseCity band.

Music history
Their first extended play, I Need You, was independently released on December 17, 2013. They released, Never Alone, on May 27, 2016, with Integrity Music.

References

External links

American musical duos
Musical groups established in 2013
Musical groups from Nashville, Tennessee
2013 establishments in Tennessee